Stephen Wrench, known professionally as Nigel Wrench, is a British radio presenter and reporter. He's the only journalist known to have interviewed both the South African activist Winnie Mandela and the British artist Banksy in a long and varied career.

Wrench's first radio job was with Capital Radio 604, which provided the first independent source of broadcast news in South Africa.

At Turnstyle News, an independent Johannesburg-based radio news agency, Wrench reported for the Canadian Broadcasting Corporation, National Public Radio, the Australian Broadcasting Corporation and the UK-based Independent Radio News and London Broadcasting Company.

In December 1985, he was among those detained briefly by police when reporting the illegal return of Winnie Mandela to Soweto.

Reporting on demonstrations in Windhoek, Namibia, in September 1988, he was among those beaten up by police.

Wrench was also a pop music columnist for the Mail & Guardian and reported on Johannesburg's thriving underground nightlife.

In 1989 Wrench joined the BBC as a London-based reporter for the Today programme. In 1990, he was among the reporters at the prison gates when Nelson Mandela walked free. Wrench reported from a wide variety of other locations for BBC Radio including Jerusalem, St Petersburg, Bucharest, Kiev and Bosnia.

Wrench was a founding co-host of Out This Week, the pioneering LGBT+ news programme on BBC Radio 5 Live for which he won a Sony Radio Award. He later won a New York Radio Award for his 1998 Radio 4 documentary Aids and Me, while also regularly co-presenting the Radio 4 programme PM. Wrench's spell as culture reporter for PM, saw him interviewing leading artists, performers, playwrights and novelists as well as reporting regularly from the Edinburgh Festival.

Wrench interviewed Banksy on PM at the opening of "Turf War", the first Banksy exhibition in London in 2003.

Among Wrench's many radio documentaries was a major BBC World Service series Pills, Patients and Profits which examined the global pharmaceutical industry.

Wrench publicly announced his status as HIV-positive in 1994, in a speech while accepting his Sony Radio Award. He wrote extensively about living with HIV and AIDS, including a regular column for the Pink Paper and made a television documentary called From Russia With Love for BBC3 in 2003.

In February 2015 Wrench released ZA86, a limited-edition cassette, through specialist label The Tapeworm. A sleeve note describes it as: "apartheid South Africa, 1986, through the headphones of a young radio reporter". A review in The Quietus took the opportunity to sum up his career: "Few journalists have quite so intimately captured the essence of their era's great moral panics as Nigel Wrench".

Wrench's second cassette for Tapeworm, ZA87, a piece of audio verité documenting a political funeral in Soweto in 1987, was released in March 2021.

Wrench was for many years a voluntary director of Duckie Ltd, the award-winning LGBT+ performance group.

Nigel Wrench now uses the name he was born with, Stephen Wrench, and has contributed, among others, an interview with Lloyd Russell-Moyle for Brighton's Gscene magazine.

In April 2022, Wrench released a field recording called /Disco/Football recorded at non league alt-football outfit Whitehawk FC.

References

Living people
BBC newsreaders and journalists
BBC radio presenters
British gay writers
English LGBT people
People from Birmingham, West Midlands
People with HIV/AIDS
Year of birth missing (living people)